Lebanon is an unincorporated census-designated place located in the town of Lebanon, Dodge County, Wisconsin, United States. Lebanon has a post office with ZIP code 53047. As of the 2010 census, its population was 204.

Images

References

Census-designated places in Dodge County, Wisconsin
Census-designated places in Wisconsin